Curaçao, officially the Country of Curaçao, is a Lesser Antilles island country in the southern Caribbean Sea and the Dutch Caribbean region, about  north of the Venezuela coast. It is a constituent country of the Kingdom of the Netherlands. Together with Aruba and Bonaire, it forms the ABC islands. Collectively, Curaçao, Aruba, and other Dutch islands in the Caribbean are often called the Dutch Caribbean. It is the largest of the ABC islands in both area and population as well as the largest of the Dutch Caribbean.

Curaçao was formerly part of the Curaçao and Dependencies colony from 1815 to 1954 and later the Netherlands Antilles from 1954 to 2010, as Island Territory of Curaçao, and is now formally called the Country of Curaçao. It includes the main island of Curaçao and the much smaller, uninhabited island of Klein Curaçao ("Little Curaçao").

Etymology 
One explanation for the island's name is that Curaçao was the autonym by which its indigenous peoples identified themselves. Early Spanish accounts support this theory, referring to the indigenous peoples as Indios Curaçaos.

From 1525, the island was featured on Spanish maps as Curaçote, Curasaote, Curasaore, and even Curacaute. By the 17th century, it appeared on most maps as Curaçao or Curazao. On a map created by Hieronymus Cock in 1562 in Antwerp, the island was called Qúracao.

A persistent but undocumented story claims the following: in the 16th and 17th centuries—the early years of European exploration—when sailors on long voyages got scurvy from lack of vitamin C, sick Portuguese or Spanish sailors were left on the island now known as Curaçao. When their ship returned, some had recovered, probably after eating vitamin C-rich fruit there. From then on, the Portuguese allegedly referred to the island as Ilha da Curação (Island of Healing) or the Spanish as Isla de la Curación.

History

Pre-colonial

The original inhabitants of Curaçao were the Arawak and Caquetio Amerindians. Their ancestors had migrated to the island from the mainland of South America, probably hundreds of years before Europeans first arrived.

Spanish colonization
The first Europeans recorded as seeing the island were members of a Spanish expedition under the leadership of Alonso de Ojeda in 1499. The Spaniards enslaved most of the Caquetios(Arawak) for forced labour in their Hispaniola colony, but paid little attention to the island itself. In 1515, almost all of the 2,000 Caquetios living there were also transported to Hispaniola as slaves.

Starting in 1499, Curaçao served as a bridge for the Spanish exploration and conquest of territories in northern South America. The Spanish settled on the island in 1527. Throughout the 16th century, they ruled Curaçao as an insular part of the province of Venezuela, governing it from the mainland before gradually abandoning it as colonization of the continent progressed. One of the oldest written references to the island is in the archives of the main public city registry of Caracas, Venezuela. A document dated 9 December 1595 states that Francisco Montesinos, priest and vicar of "the Yslas de Curasao, Aruba and Bonaire" conferred his power of attorney to Pedro Gutiérrez de Lugo, a Caracas resident, to collect his ecclesiastic salary from the Royal Treasury of King Philip II of Spain.

The Spanish introduced numerous tree, plant and animal species to Curaçao, including horses, sheep, goats, pigs and cattle from Europe and other Spanish colonies. In general, imported sheep, goats and cattle did relatively well. Cattle were herded by Caquetios and Spaniards and roamed freely in the kunuku plantations and savannas.

Not all imported species fared equally well, and the Spanish also learned to use Caquetio crops and agricultural methods, as well as those from other Caribbean islands. Though historical sources point to thousands of people living on the island, agricultural yields were disappointing; this and the lack of precious metals in the salt mines led the Spanish to call Curaçao "the useless island".

Over time, the number of Spaniards living on Curaçao decreased while the number of aboriginal inhabitants stabilized. Presumably through natural growth, return and colonization, the Caquetio population then began to increase. In the last decades of Spanish occupation, Curaçao was used as a large cattle ranch. At that point, Spaniards lived around Santa Barbara, Santa Ana and in the villages in the western part of the island, while the Caquetios are thought to have lived scattered all over the island.

Dutch colonial rule
In 1634, during the Eighty Years' War of independence between the Republic of the Netherlands and Spain, the Dutch West India Company under Admiral Johann van Walbeeck invaded the island; the Spanish surrendered in San Juan in August. Approximately 30 Spaniards and many indigenous people were then deported to Santa Ana de Coro in Venezuela. About 30 Taíno families were allowed to live on the island while Dutch colonists started settling there. 

The Dutch West India Company founded the capital of Willemstad on the banks of an inlet called the Schottegat; the natural harbour proved an ideal place for trade. Commerce and shipping—and piracy—became Curaçao's most important economic activities. Later, salt mining became a major industry, the mineral being a lucrative export at the time. From 1662, the Dutch West India Company made Curaçao a centre of the Atlantic slave trade, often bringing slaves from West Africa to the island, before selling them elsewhere in the Caribbean and Spanish Main.

Sephardic Jews fleeing persecution in Spain and Portugal sought safe haven in Dutch Brazil and the Dutch Republic. Many settled in Curaçao, where they made significant contributions to its civil society, cultural development and economic prosperity.

In the Franco-Dutch War of 1672–78, French Count Jean II d'Estrées planned to attack Curaçao. His fleet—12 men-of-war, three fire ships, two transports, a hospital ship, and 12 privateers—met with disaster, losing seven men-of-war and two other ships when they struck reefs off the Las Aves archipelago. The serious navigational error occurred on 11 May 1678, a week after the fleet set sail from Saint Kitts. To commemorate its narrow escape from invasion, Curaçao marked the events with a day of thanksgiving, which was celebrated for decades into the 18th century.

Many Dutch colonists grew affluent from the slave trade, building impressive colonial buildings in the capital of Willemstad; the city is now a UNESCO World Heritage Site.

In 1795, a major slave revolt took place under the leaders Tula Rigaud, Louis Mercier, Bastian Karpata, and Pedro Wakao. Up to 4,000 slaves in northwest Curaçao revolted, with more than 1,000 taking part in extended gunfights. After a month, the slave owners were able to suppress the revolt.

Curaçao's proximity to South America resulted in interaction with cultures of the coastal areas more than a century after the independence of the Netherlands from Spain. Architectural similarities can be seen between 19th century Willemstad neighborhoods and the nearby Venezuelan city of Coro in Falcón State, which has also been designated a World Heritage Site. Netherlands established economic ties with the Viceroyalty of New Granada that included the present-day countries of Colombia and Venezuela. In the 19th century, Curaçaoans such as Manuel Piar and Luis Brión were prominently engaged in the wars of independence of both Venezuela and Colombia. Political refugees from the mainland, such as Simon Bolivar, regrouped in Curaçao.

During the 18th and 19th centuries, the British attacked the island several times, most notably in 1800, 1804, and from 1807 to 1815. Stable Dutch rule returned in 1815 at the end of the Napoleonic wars, when the island was incorporated into the colony of Curaçao and Dependencies.

The Dutch abolished slavery in 1863, causing vast changes in the economy with the shift to wage labour. Some Curaçao inhabitants emigrated to other islands, such as Cuba, to work in sugarcane plantations. Other former slaves had nowhere to go and continued working for plantation owners under the tenant farmer system, in which former slaves leased land from former masters, paying most of their harvest to owners as rent. The system lasted until the early 20th century.

Historically, Dutch was not widely spoken on the island outside of the colonial administration, but its use increased in the late 19th and early 20th centuries. Students on Curaçao, Aruba, and Bonaire were taught predominantly in Spanish until the late 17th century, when the British took all three islands. Teaching of Spanish was restored when Dutch rule resumed in 1815. Also, efforts were made to introduce widespread bilingual Dutch and Papiamentu education in the late 19th century.

20th and 21st centuries
When oil was discovered in the Venezuelan Maracaibo Basin town of Mene Grande in 1914, Curaçao's economy was dramatically altered. In the early years, both Shell and Exxon held drilling concessions in Venezuela, which ensured a constant supply of crude oil to refineries in Aruba and Curaçao. Crude oil production in Venezuela was inexpensive. Both Shell and Exxon were vertically integrated and controlled the entire industry, from pumping, transporting, and refining to sales. The refineries on Aruba and Curaçao operated in global markets and were profitable partly because of the margin between the production costs of crude oil and the revenues made off of products. This provided a safety net for losses incurred through inefficiency or excessive operating costs at the refineries.

In 1929, Curaçao was attacked by Venezuelan rebel commander Rafael Simón Urbina, who, with 250 soldiers, captured the fort. The Venezuelans plundered weapons, ammunition, and the island's treasury. They also managed to capture the Governor of the island, Leonardus Albertus Fruytier (1882-1972), and hauled him off to Venezuela on a stolen American ship, Maracaibo. Fruytier was criticized and had to resign as governor. After returning to the Netherlands, he settled for a position as chief inspector in Maastricht. The Dutch increased their military presence on the island.

In 1954, Curaçao and other Dutch Caribbean colonies were joined together to form the Netherlands Antilles. Discontent with Curaçao's seemingly subordinate relationship to the Netherlands, ongoing racial discrimination, and a rise in unemployment owing to layoffs in the oil industry led to a series of riots in 1969. The riots resulted in two deaths, numerous injuries and severe damage in Willemstad. In response, the Dutch government introduced far-reaching reforms, allowing Afro-Curaçaoans greater influence over the island's political and economic life, and increased the prominence of the local Papiamentu language.

Curaçao experienced an economic downturn in the early 1980s. Shell's refinery on the island operated with significant losses from 1975 to 1979, and again from 1982 to 1985. Persistent losses, global overproduction, stronger competition, and low market expectations threatened the refinery's future. In 1985, after 70 years, Royal Dutch Shell decided to end its activities on Curaçao. This came at a crucial moment. Curaçao's fragile economy had been stagnant for some time. Several revenue-generating sectors suffered even more during this period: tourism from Venezuela collapsed after the devaluation of the bolivar, and a slowdown in the transportation sector had deleterious effects on the Antillean Airline Company and the Curaçao Dry Dock Company. The offshore financial services industry also experienced a downturn due to new U.S. tax laws.

In the mid-1980s, Shell sold its refinery for the symbolic amount of one Antillean guilder to a local government consortium. In recent years, the aging refinery has been the subject of lawsuits alleging that its emissions, including sulfur dioxide and particulate matter, far exceed safety standards. The government consortium leases the refinery to the Venezuelan PDVSA state oil company.

Continuing economic hardship in the late 1990s and early 2000s resulted in much emigration to the Netherlands.

On 1 July 2007, Curaçao was due to become a country within the Kingdom of the Netherlands, like Aruba and the Netherlands Antilles. On 28 November 2006, the change was delayed when the island council rejected a clarification memorandum on the process. A new island council ratified this agreement on 9 July 2007. On 15 December 2008, Curaçao was again scheduled to become a separate country within the Kingdom of the Netherlands. A non-binding referendum on the move was held in Curaçao on 15 May 2009; 52% of voters supported it.

Since the dissolution of the Netherlands Antilles
The dissolution of the Netherlands Antilles came into effect on 10 October 2010. Curaçao became a country within the Kingdom of the Netherlands, with the kingdom retaining responsibility for defence and foreign policy. The kingdom was also tasked with overseeing the island's finances under a debt-relief arrangement agreed upon between the two. Curaçao's first prime minister was Gerrit Schotte. He was succeeded in 2012 by Stanley Betrian, ad interim. After the 2012 elections, Daniel Hodge became the third prime minister on 31 December 2012. He led a demissionary cabinet until 7 June 2013, when a new cabinet under the leadership of Ivar Asjes was sworn in.

Although Curaçao is autonomous, the Netherlands has intervened in its affairs to ensure that parliamentary elections are held and to assist in finalizing accurate budgets. In July 2017, Curaçaoan Prime Minister Eugene Rhuggenaath said he wanted Curaçao to take full responsibility over its affairs, but asked for more cooperation and assistance from the Netherlands, with suggestions for more innovative approaches to help Curaçao succeed and increase its standard of living. The Dutch government reminded the Curaçaoan government that it had provided assistance with oil refinery negotiations with the Chinese "on numerous occasions".

The 2020 COVID-19 pandemic resulted in austerity measures. Curaçao had to impose spending cuts to qualify for additional aid from the Netherlands. As part of the austerity package, the Government of Curaçao announced a 12.5% cut in benefits for civil servants. On 24 June 2020, a group of civil servants, together with waste collectors from Selikor, marched to Fort Amsterdam and demanded to speak with Rhuggenaath. The demonstration turned into a riot, and police cleared the square in front of Fort Amsterdam with tear gas. The city centre of Willemstad was later looted. 48 people were arrested, the city districts of Punda and Otrobanda were placed under lockdown for the night, and a general curfew was declared from 20:30 to 06:00.

Geography 

Curaçao, as well as the rest of the ABC islands and Trinidad and Tobago, lies on the continental shelf of South America. The coastline's bays, inlets and hot springs offer a source of natural minerals, thermal conditions, and seawater used in hydrotherapy and mesotherapy, making the island one of many balneoclimateric areas in the region. Off the southeast coast lies the small, flat island of Klein Curaçao.

Flora 
Curaçao's flora differ from typical tropical island vegetation. Guajira-Barranquilla xeric scrub is the most notable, with various forms of cacti, thorny shrubs, evergreen, and watapana trees (Libidibia coriaria; called divi-divi on Aruba), which are characteristic of the ABC islands and the national symbol of Aruba. Brassavola nodosa is a drought-tolerant species of Brassavola, one of the few orchids present in the ABC islands. Cacti include Melocactus and Opuntia species such as Opuntia stricta.

Fauna 

Curaçao is semi-arid, and as such has not supported the numerous tropical species of mammals, birds, and lizards most associated with rainforests. Dozens of species of hummingbirds, bananaquits, orioles, and the larger terns, herons, egrets, and even flamingos make their homes near ponds or in coastal areas. The trupial, a black bird with a bright orange underbelly and white swatches on its wings, is common to Curaçao. The mockingbird, called chuchubi in Papiamentu, resembles the North American mockingbird, with a long white-grey tail and a grey back. Near shorelines, big-billed brown pelicans feed on fish. Other seabirds include several types of gulls and large cormorants.

Other than field mice, small rabbits, and cave bats, Curaçao's most notable animal is the white-tailed deer. This deer is related to the American white-tailed deer, or Virginia deer, found in areas from North America through Central America and the Caribbean, and as far south as Bolivia. It has a long tail with a white underside, and is the only type of deer on the island. It has been a protected species since 1926, and an estimated 200 live on Curaçao. They are found in many parts of the island, but most notably at the west end's Christoffel Park, where about 70% of the herd resides. Archaeologists believe the deer were brought from South America to Curaçao by its original inhabitants, the Arawaks.

There are several species of iguana, light green in colour with shimmering shades of aqua along the belly and sides, found lounging in the sun across the island. The iguanas found on Curaçao serve not only as a scenic attraction but, unlike many islands that gave up the practice years ago, remain hunted for food. Along the west end of the island's north shore are several inlets that have become home to breeding sea turtles. These turtles are protected by the park system in Shete Boka Park, and can be visited accompanied by park rangers.

Climate 
Curaçao has a hot, semi-arid climate (Köppen climate classification BSh) with a dry season from January to September and a wet season from October to December. Rainfall is scarce, only 450 millimeters (12 inches) per year; in particular, the rainy season is drier than it normally is in tropical climates; during the dry season, it almost never rains. Owing to the scarcity of rainfall, the landscape of Curaçao is arid; especially on the north coast of the island. Temperatures are relatively constant, with small differences measured throughout the year. The trade winds cool the island during the day and warm it at night.

Because Curaçao lies North of the Intertropical Convergence Zone and in an area of low-level divergence where winds flow parallel to the coast, its climate is much drier than expected for the northeastern side of a continent at its latitude. Rainfall is also extremely variable from year to year, being strongly linked to the El Niño Southern Oscillation.

Curaçao lies outside the Atlantic's Hurricane Alley but is still occasionally affected by hurricanes, as with Hurricane Hazel in 1954, Anna in 1961, Felix in 2007, and Omar in 2008. No hurricane has made landfall in Curaçao since the US National Hurricane Center started tracking hurricanes. Curaçao has, however, been directly affected by pre-hurricane tropical storms several times; the latest being Hurricane Tomas in 2010, Cesar in 1996, Joan in 1988, Cora and Greta in 1978, Edith and Irene in 1971, and Francelia in 1969. This made Tomas one of the wettest events in the island's history, as well as one of the most devastating; its flooding killed two people and caused over NAƒ50 million (US$28 million) in damage.

According to the Emissions Database for Global Atmospheric Research, average carbon dioxide emissions per person on the island were 52 tonnes in 2018, the second highest in the world.

Meteo, the Curaçao weather department, provides up-to-date information about weather conditions via its website and mobile apps for iOS and Android.
 Climate change 
Average temperatures have risen sharply in the past 40 years in the Caribbean Netherlands and Curaçao has experienced more warm days and fewer cooler nights. The Intergovernmental Panel on Climate Change predicts that should air temperatures increase by 1.4 degrees, there will be a 5% to 6% decrease in rainfall, increased frequency and intensity of extreme weather events (including a 66% increase in hurricane intensity), and a 0.5- to 0.6-meter sea-level rise in the Caribbean Netherlands.

Geology 

The northern seabed drops steeply within  of the Curaçaoan shore. This drop-off is known as the "blue edge".

On Curaçao, four major geological formations can be found: the lava formation, the Knip formation, the Mid-Curaçao formation and limestone formations.

Curaçao lies within the Caribbean large igneous province (CLIP) with key exposures of those lavas existing on the island consisting of the Curaçao Lava Formation (CLF). The CLF consists of 5 km of pillow lavas with some basalt intrusions. The ages of these rocks include 89 Ma for the lavas and 75 Ma for the poikilitic sills, though some sequences may have erupted as late as 62–66 Ma, placing them in the Cretaceous period. Their composition includes picrite pillows at the base, followed by tholeiitic lavas, then hyaloclastites, then the poikilitic sills. The CLF was gradually uplifted until Eocene-Miocene limestone caps formed, before final exposure above sea level. Christoffelberg and the Zevenbergen (Seven Hills) portion of the island have exposures of the Knip Formation. This formation includes deepwater deposits of calcareous sands and fine clays, capped by siliceous chert containing radiolarians. Middle Curaçao contains alluvial soils from eroded CLF and limestone.

Beaches 

Curaçao has a large number of beaches. Most are on the south side of the island. The best known are:

 Baya Beach
 Blue Bay
 Boca Sami
 Daaibooi
 Grote Knip (Kenepa Grandi)
 Kleine Knip (Kenepa Chiki)
 Kokomo Beach
 Mambo Beach
 Piscaderabaai
 Playa Forti
 Playa Jeremi
 Playa Kas Abao
 Playa Kalki
 Playa Kanoa
 Playa Lagun
 Playa Porto Marie
 Playa Santa Cruz
 Playa Santa Barbara
 Seaquarium Beach
 Sint Michielsbaai
 Vaersenbaai 
 Westpunt

Curaçao has a total of 37 beaches.

Architecture 
The island has diverse architectural styles reflecting the influence of the various historical rulers over the region, including Spain, the Netherlands, with more modern elements under Western influence primarily including the United States and other European countries. This ranges from ruins and colonial buildings to modern infrastructure.

Forts 

When the Dutch arrived in 1634, they built forts at key points around the island to protect themselves from foreign powers, privateers, and pirates. Six of the best-preserved forts can still be seen today:

 Fort Amsterdam (1635)
 Fort Beekenburg (1703)
 Fort Nassau (1797)
 Waterfort (1826)
 Rif Fort (1828)
 Fort Piscadera (built between 1701 and 1704)

In 1957, the hotel Van der Valk Plaza Curaçao was built on top of the Waterfort.

The Rif Fort is located opposite of the Waterfort, across the Otrobanda harbour entrance. It contains restaurants and shops, and in 2009, the Renaissance Curaçao Resort and Casino opened next to it.

Government

Curaçao is a constituent country of the Kingdom of the Netherlands. Its governance takes place in a framework of a parliamentary representative democracy. The King of the Netherlands is the head of state, represented locally by a governor, with the Prime Minister of Curaçao serving as head of government. Executive power is exercised by the government. Legislative power is vested in both the government and parliament.

The judiciary is independent of the executive and the legislature. Convicted felons are held at the Curaçao Centre for Detention and Correction.

Curaçao has full autonomy over most matters; the exceptions are outlined in the Charter for the Kingdom of the Netherlands under the title "Kingdom affairs".

Military 

Defence of the island is the responsibility of the Netherlands. The Netherlands Armed Forces deploy both ground and naval units in the Caribbean with some of these forces based on Curacao. These forces include: 

 a company of the Royal Netherlands Army on Curaçao on a rotational basis;
 a Fast Raiding Interception and Special Forces Craft (FRISC) troop (fast boats);
 a guardship, normally a Holland-class offshore patrol vessel, from the Royal Netherlands Navy on station in the Caribbean on a rotational basis;
 the Royal Netherlands Navy support vessel HNLMS Pelikaan;
 Curmil (Curaçaoan) militia elements;
 Elements of a Royal Marechaussee brigade of the Armed Forces.

Two Dutch naval bases, Parera and Suffisant, are located on the island of Curaçao. Officers of the Arubaanse Militie complete additional training on Curaçao.

On the west side of Curaçao International Airport are hangars for the two Bombardier Dash 8 Maritime Patrol Aircraft and two AgustaWestland AW139 helicopters of the Dutch Caribbean Coast Guard. Until 2007, the site was a Royal Netherlands Navy air base which operated for 55 years with a wide variety of aircraft, including Fireflies, Avengers, Trackers, Neptunes, Fokker F-27s, P-3C Orions, Fokker F-60s and several helicopter types. After the political decision to sell off all Orions, the air base wasn't needed anymore.

The west end of the airport is a USAF Forward Operating Location (FOL). The base hosts Airborne Warning And Control System (AWACS), cargo aircraft, aerial refueling planes, and reconnaissance aircraft. Until 1999, the USAF operated a small fleet of F-16 fighters from the FOL. The PAE corporation runs base operations at the FOL.

Conscription 
Suffisant Naval Base has facilities used for conscription in the Caribbean. There has been no military conscription since 1997, but a form of civil conscription has replaced it, compelling underprivileged young Antilleans to undertake professional training.

Politics
After being part of the Netherlands Antilles, Curaçao became autonomous, along with Sint Maarten island, while the less-populated islands of Bonaire, Sint Eustatius and Saba remained special municipalities governed by the Netherlands.

Economy 

Curaçao has an open economy; its most important sectors are tourism, international trade, shipping services, oil refining, oil storage and bunkering, and international financial services. Venezuelan state oil company PDVSA's lease on the island's oil refinery expired in 2019; the facility employs 1,000 people, refining oil from Venezuela for export to the US and Asia. Schlumberger, the world's largest oil field services company, is incorporated in Curaçao. The  is said to be responsible for Curaçao's position as one of the world's top five highest per capita CO2 emission-producing countries.

Along with Sint Maarten, Curaçao uses the Netherlands Antillean guilder as its currency. Its economy is well-developed, supporting a high standard of living, ranking 46th in the world in terms of GDP (PPP) per capita and 27th in the world in terms of nominal GDP per capita. Curaçao possesses a high-income economy as defined by the World Bank. 
Activities related to the port of Willemstad, such as the Free Trade Zone, make significant contributions to the economy. To achieve greater economic diversification, the Curaçaoan government is increasing its efforts to attract more foreign investment. This policy, called the "Open Arms" policy, features a heavy focus on attracting information technology companies.

Since 2016, reduced foreign demand for goods due to the ongoing unrest and political uncertainty in Venezuela has led to decreased exports and increased domestic demand for goods and services, resulting in economic stagnation. While many economic sectors contracted, expansion took place in the construction, financial intermediation, and utilities sectors.

Tourism 

While tourism plays a major role in Curaçao's economy, the island is less reliant on tourism than many other Caribbean countries. Most tourists come to Curaçao from the Netherlands, the eastern United States, South America and other Caribbean islands. Curaçao was a Caribbean leader in cruise ship tourism growth, with 610,186 cruise passengers in 2013, a 41.4% increase over the previous year. Hato International Airport received 1,772,501 passengers in 2013 and announced capital investments totaling US$48 million aimed at transforming the airport into a regional hub by 2018.

The Curaçaoan insular shelf's sharp drop-off known as the "Blue Edge" is often visited by scuba diving tourists. Coral reefs for snorkeling and scuba diving can be reached without a boat. The southern coast has calm waters as well as many small beaches, such as Jan Thiel and Cas Abou. At the westernmost point of the island is Watamula and the Cliff Villa Peninsula which are good locations for drift diving. The coastline of Curaçao features numerous bays and inlets which serve as popular mooring locations for boats.

In June 2017, the island was named the Top Cruise Destination in the Southern Caribbean by Cruise Critic, a major online forum. The winners of the Destination Awards were selected based on comments from cruise passengers who rated the downtown area of Willemstad as "amazing" and the food and shopping as "excellent". The historic centre of Willemstad is a World Heritage Site. Another attraction is the towns colourful street art. the Blue Bay Sculpture Garden with works from known Curaçao artists is situated in a nearby resort. Landhuis Bloemhof is an art museum and gallery located in Willemstad.

Some of the coral reefs are affected by tourism. Porto Marie Beach is experimenting with artificial coral reefs in order to improve the reef's condition. Hundreds of artificial coral blocks that have been placed are now home to a large array of tropical fish. It is now under investigation to see if the sewer waste of hotels is a partial cause of the dying of the coral reef.

Labour 
In 2016, a Labour Force Survey (LFS) indicated that the unemployment rate was 13.3%. For residents ages 15–64, the employment rate was 70.4%.

Financial services 
Curaçao's history in financial services dates back to World War I. Prior to this period, the financial arms of local merchant houses functioned as informal lenders to the community. However, at the turn of the 20th century, Curaçao underwent industrialization, and a number of merchant houses established private commercial banks. As the economy grew, these banks began assuming additional functions eventually becoming full-fledged financial institutions.

The Dutch Caribbean Securities Exchange is located in the capital of Willemstad, as is the Central Bank of Curaçao and Sint Maarten; the latter of which dates to 1828. It is the oldest central bank in the Western Hemisphere. The island's legal system supports a variety of corporate structures and is a corporate haven. Though Curaçao is considered a tax haven, it adheres to the EU Code of Conduct against harmful tax practices. It holds a qualified intermediary status from the United States Internal Revenue Service. It is an accepted jurisdiction of the OECD and Caribbean Financial Action Task Force on Money Laundering. The country enforces Anti-Money Laundering and Counter-Terrorism funding compliance.

Foreign Account Tax Compliance Act 

On 30 June 2014, Curaçao was deemed to have an Inter-Governmental Agreement (IGA) with the United States of America with respect to the "Foreign Account Tax Compliance Act" of the United States of America. The Tax Information Exchange Agreement signed in Washington, D.C. on 17 April 2002 between the U.S. and the Kingdom of the Netherlands includes Curaçao, and was updated with respect to Curaçao in 2014, taking effect in 2016.

Trade 
Curaçao trades mainly with the United States, Venezuela, and the European Union. It has an Association Agreement with the European Union which allows companies which do business in and via Curaçao to export products to European markets, free of import duties and quotas. It is also a participant in the US Caribbean Basin Initiative allowing it to have preferential access to the US market.

Prostitution 

Prostitution in Curaçao is legal only for foreign women who get a temporary permit to work in the large open-air brothel called "Le Mirage" or "Campo Alegre". Using prostitution services is legal for men (locals included). The brothel has operated near the airport since the 1940s. Curaçao monitors, contains and regulates the industry. The government states that the workers in these establishments are thereby given a safe environment and access to medical practitioners. However this approach does exclude local women (or men) to legally make a living from prostitution and does lead to loss of local income, as the foreign prostitutes send or take most of their earnings home.

The U.S. State Department has cited anecdotal evidence claiming that, "Curaçao...[is a] destination island... for women trafficked for the sex trade from Peru, Brazil, Colombia, the Dominican Republic, and Haiti, according to local observers. At least 500 foreign women reportedly are in prostitution throughout the five islands of the Antilles, some of whom have been trafficked." The US Department of State has said that the government of Curaçao frequently underestimates the extent of human trafficking problems.

Demographics 

Owing to the island's history of colonial times, the majority of the Curaçaoans are of African, or partial African descent. There are also many people of Dutch, French, Latin American, South Asian, East Asian, and Levantine descent.

Religion 

The religious breakdown of the population of Curaçao, according to a 2011 estimate:
Roman Catholic; 69.8%
Adventist; 9%
Evangelical; 8.9%
Pentecostal; 7.6%
Other Protestant; 3.2%
Jehovah's Witnesses; 2%
Other; 3.8%
None; 10%
Unspecified; 0.6%

There has been a shift towards the Charismatic movement in recent decades. Other denominations include the Seventh-day Adventist Church and the Methodist Church. Alongside these Christian denominations, some inhabitants practise Montamentu and other diaspora African religions. As elsewhere in Latin America, Pentecostalism is on the rise. There are also practising Muslims and Hindus.

The Roman Catholic Diocese of Willemstad encompasses all the territory of the Kingdom of the Netherlands in the Caribbean which includes Aruba, Curaçao, Sint Maarten, and the islands of Bonaire, St. Eustatius and Saba. The diocese is also a member of the Antilles Episcopal Conference.

While small, Curaçao's Jewish community has had a significant impact on the island's history. Curaçao has the oldest active Jewish congregation in the Americas, dating to 1651. The Curaçao synagogue is the oldest synagogue of the Americas in continuous use, since its completion in 1732 on the site of a previous synagogue. Additionally, there are both Sephardic and Ashkenazi Jewish communities. As of the year 2000 there were approximately 300 Jewish people living on the island.

Languages 
Curaçao is a polyglot society. The official languages are Dutch, Papiamentu and English. However, Dutch is the sole language for all administration and legal matters. Most of Curaçao's population is able to converse in at least two of the languages of Papiamentu, Dutch, English, and Spanish.

The most widely spoken language is Papiamentu, a Portuguese creole with African, Dutch and Spanish influences, spoken in all levels of society. Papiamentu was introduced as a language of primary school education in 1993, making Curaçao one of a handful of places where a creole language is used as a medium to acquire basic literacy.
Spanish and English also have a long historical presence in Curaçao. Spanish became an important language in the 18th century due to the close economic ties with Spanish territories in what are now Venezuela and Colombia and several Venezuelan TV networks are received. Use of English dates to the early 19th century, when the British took Curaçao, Aruba and Bonaire. When Dutch rule resumed in 1815, officials already noted wide use of the language.

According to the 2001 census, Papiamentu is the first language of 81.2% of the population. Dutch is the first language of 8%, Spanish of 4%, and English of 2.9%. However, these numbers divide the population in terms of first language and do not account for the high rate of bilingualism in the population of Curaçao.

Localities 
Curaçao was divided into five districts from 1863 to 1925, after which it was reduced to the two outer districts of Bandabou and Bandariba and the city district of Willemstad. Over the years, the capital, Willemstad, encompassed the entire area surrounding the large natural harbour, the Schottegat. As a result, many formerly isolated villages have grown together to form a large urbanised area. The city covers approximately one third of the entire island in the east. Willemstad's most famous neighbourhoods are:

 Punda, the historic city centre with the Handelskade on St. Anna Bay.
 Otrobanda, on the other side of St. Anna Bay
 Pietermaai, east of Punda
 Scharloo, north of Punda and Pietermaai, across the Waaigat
 Julianadorp, a suburb on the west side of the city, built around 1928 on behalf of Shell for its personnel
 Emmastad, built for Shell in the 1950s, after Julianadorp was full.
 Saliña is situated next to Punda and has many shops and restaurants.
 Brievengat, a suburb in the north of the city.

Statistics

Education 

Public education is based on the Dutch educational system and besides the public schools, private and parochial schools are also available. Since the introduction of a new public education law in 1992, compulsory primary education starts at age six and continues for six years; secondary lasts for another four.

The main institute of higher learning is the University of Curaçao (formerly University of The Netherlands Antilles), enrolling 2,100 students. The comprehensive model of education is influenced by both the Dutch and American education systems. Other higher education offerings on the island include offshore medical schools, language schools and academies for fine art, music, police, teacher and nurse-training.

Culture

Literature 
Despite the island's relatively small population, the diversity of languages and cultural influences on Curaçao have generated a remarkable literary tradition, primarily in Dutch and Papiamentu. The oral traditions of the Arawak indigenous peoples are lost. West African slaves brought the tales of Anansi, thus forming the basis of Papiamentu literature. The first published work in Papiamentu was a poem by Joseph Sickman Corsen entitled Atardi, published in the La Cruz newspaper in 1905. Throughout Curaçaoan literature, narrative techniques and metaphors best characterized as magic realism tend to predominate. Novelists and poets from Curaçao have contributed to Caribbean and Dutch literature. Best known are Cola Debrot, Frank Martinus Arion, Pierre Lauffer, Guillermo Rosario,  and Tip Marugg.

Cuisine 
Local food is called Krioyo (pronounced the same as criollo, the Spanish word for "Creole") and boasts a blend of flavours and techniques best compared to Caribbean cuisine and Latin American cuisine. Dishes common in Curaçao are found in Aruba and Bonaire as well. Popular dishes include stobá (a stew made with various ingredients such as papaya, beef or goat), Guiambo (soup made from okra and seafood), kadushi (cactus soup), sopi mondongo (intestine soup), funchi (cornmeal paste similar to fufu, ugali and polenta) and fish and other seafood. The ubiquitous side dish is fried plantain. Local bread rolls are made according to a Portuguese recipe. All around the island, there are snèks which serve local dishes as well as alcoholic drinks in a manner akin to the English public house.

The ubiquitous breakfast dish is pastechi: fried pastry with fillings of cheese, tuna, ham, or ground meat. Around the holiday season special dishes are consumed, such as the hallaca and pekelé, made out of salt cod. At weddings and other special occasions a variety of kos dushi are served: kokada (coconut sweets), ko'i lechi (condensed milk and sugar sweet) and tentalaria (peanut sweets). The Curaçao liqueur was developed here, when a local experimented with the rinds of the local citrus fruit known as laraha. Surinamese, Chinese, Indonesian, Indian and Dutch culinary influences also abound. The island also has a number of Chinese restaurants that serve mainly Indonesian dishes such as satay, nasi goreng and lumpia (which are all Indonesian names for the dishes). Dutch specialties such as croquettes and oliebollen are widely served in homes and restaurants.

Sports 

In 2004, the Little League Baseball team from Willemstad, Curaçao, won the world title in a game against the United States champion from Thousand Oaks, California. The Willemstad lineup included Jurickson Profar, the standout shortstop prospect who now plays for the San Diego Padres of Major League Baseball, and Jonathan Schoop.

Curaçaoan players Andruw Jones, Ozzie Albies, and Kenley Jansen have made multiple Major League Baseball All-Star Game appearances.

The 2010 documentary film Boys of Summer details Curaçao's Pabao Little League All-Stars winning their country's eighth straight championship at the 2008 Little League World Series, then going on to defeat other teams, including Puerto Rico and the Dominican Republic, and earning a spot in Williamsport.

The prevailing trade winds and warm water make Curaçao a location for windsurfing.

There is warm, clear water around the island.

Curaçao participated in the 2013 CARIFTA Games. Vanessa Philbert stood second the under-17 female  with a time of 4:47.97.

The Curaçao national football team won the 2017 Caribbean Cup by defeating Jamaica in the final, qualifying for the 2017 CONCACAF Gold Cup. They then traveled to Thailand and participated in the 2019 King's Cup for the first time, eventually winning the tournament by beating Vietnam in the final.

Infrastructure

Airport 
Curaçao International Airport (also called Hato International Airport) is located on the northern coast of the island and offers connections to the Caribbean region, South America, North America and Europe. Curaçao Airport is a fairly large facility, with the third longest commercial runway in the Caribbean region after Rafael Hernández Airport in Puerto Rico and Pointe-à-Pitre International Airport in Guadeloupe. The airport served as a main base for Insel Air, and for Air ALM, the former national airlines of Curaçao.

Railways 
In 1887 a horse drawn street tramway opened in Punda, the part of the capital Willemstad on the eastern side of Sint Annabaai. It had a U-shaped route about 2 km in length. In 1896, a tramway opened in Otrabanda on the opposite side of the bay, but it ceased operations within a few months. The Punda line was rebuilt in 1911, regauged to metre gauge, and the horse drawn trams replaced by petrol engined ones. The line closed in 1920.

Bridges 

This swings open to allow the passage of ships to and from the port. The bridge was originally opened in 1888 and the current bridge was installed in 1939. It is best known and, more often than not, referred to by the locals as "Our Swinging Old Lady".

The Queen Juliana Bridge connects mobile traffic between the same two districts.

Utilities and sanitation 
Aqualectra, a government-owned company and full member of CARILEC, delivers potable water and electricity to the island. Rates are controlled by the government. Water is produced by reverse osmosis or desalinization. It services 69,000 households and companies using 130,000 water and electric meters. The power generation company NuCuraçao opened wind farms in Tera Kora and Playa Kanoa in 2012, and expanded in Tera Kora in 2015. There is no natural gas distribution grid; gas is supplied to homes by pressurized containers.

Curbside trash pickup is provided by the Selikor company. There is no recycling pickup, but there are drop-off centers for certain recycled materials at the Malpais landfill, and various locations operated by Green Force; private haulers recycle construction waste, paper, and cardboard.

Notable residents 
People from Curaçao include:

Arts and culture 

Izaline Calister, singer-songwriter
Joceline Clemencia, writer
Peter Hartman, past-CEO of KLM
May Henriquez, writer and sculptor
Tip Marugg, writer
Kizzy, a singer songwriter and television personality based in the United States
Ruënna Mercelina, model, actress, beauty queen
Robby Müller, cinematographer, closely associated with Wim Wenders and Jim Jarmusch
Wim Statius Muller, composer, pianist
Pernell Saturnino, a graduated percussionist of Berklee College of Music
Sherman Smith (musician), singer-songwriter
Ellen Spijkstra, ceramist
Siny van Iterson, children's writer

Politics and government 
Luis Brión, admiral in the Venezuelan War of Independence
Moises Frumencio da Costa Gomez, first Prime Minister of the Netherlands Antilles
George Maduro, a war hero and namesake of Madurodam in The Hague
Manuel Carlos Piar, general and competitor of Bolivar during the Venezuelan War of Independence
Tula, leader of the 1795 slave revolt

Sports

Baseball 
Players in Minor League Baseball:

 Sharlon Schoop, professional infielder 

Players in Major League Baseball:

Ozzie Albies, professional second baseman
Wladimir Balentien, professional outfielder
Roger Bernadina, professional outfielder
Didi Gregorius, professional shortstop
Kenley Jansen, professional pitcher
Andruw Jones, professional outfielder
Jair Jurrjens, professional pitcher
Shairon Martis, professional pitcher
Hensley Meulens, professional baseball player and hitting coach
Jurickson Profar, professional infielder
Jonathan Schoop, professional infielder
Andrelton Simmons, professional shortstop
Randall Simon, first baseman

Football

Vurnon Anita, a football player for Leeds United in the English EFL Championship
Juninho Bacuna, footballer playing for Birmingham City in the English EFL Championship.
Leandro Bacuna, footballer playing for Cardiff City in the English EFL Championship.
Roly Bonevacia, a footballer who plays for Al-Faisaly in the Saudi Professional League
Tahith Chong, a footballer playing for Birmingham City in the English EFL Championship.
Jeremy Cijntje, footballer playing for Heracles in the Dutch Eredivisie.
Sontje Hansen, footballer playing for Ajax in the Dutch Eredivisie.
Rangelo Janga, a footballer who plays for FC Astana in the Kazakhstan Premier League.
Jürgen Locadia, footballer playing for Brighton & Hove Albion in the English Premier League.
Cuco Martina, footballer playing for Everton in the English Premier League
Bradley Martis, footballer playing for Sparta Rotterdam in the Dutch Eerste Divisie
Quentin Martinus, footballer playing for Urawa Red Diamonds in the Japan J1 League.
Darryl Lachman, footballer who plays for Perth Glory in the Australian A-League.
Eloy Room, footballer playing for Columbus Crew SC in the American Major League Soccer.
Anthony van den Hurk, footballer playing for Helsingborg in the Swedish Superettan.
Jetro Willems, footballer playing for Eintracht Frankfurt in the German Bundesliga.

Other sports
Jemyma Betrian, professional mixed-martial-arts (MMA) fighter
Liemarvin Bonevacia, professional sprinter
Marc de Maar, professional cyclist
Churandy Martina, gold medalist 100 metres at the Pan American Games 2007
Jordann Pikeur, professional kickboxer
Jean-Julien Rojer, professional tennis player
Roelly Winklaar, IFBB pro bodybuilder

See also 

Leeward Antilles
Telecommunications in Curaçao

Notes

References 

Habitantenan di Kòrsou, sinku siglo di pena i gloria: 1499–1999. Römer-Kenepa, NC, Gibbes, FE, Skriwanek, MA., 1999. Curaçao: Fundashon Curaçao 500.
Social movements, violence, and change: the May Movement in Curaçao. WA Anderson, RR Dynes, 1975. Columbus: Ohio State University Press.
Stemmen uit het Verleden. Van Buurt, G., Joubert, S., 1994, Curaçao.
Het Patroon van de Oude Curaçaose Samenleving. Hoetink, H., 1987. Amsterdam: Emmering.
Dede pikiña ku su bisiña: Papiamentu-Nederlands en de onverwerkt verleden tijd. van Putte, Florimon., 1999. Zutphen: de Walburg Pers

Further reading 
Corcos, Joseph. A Synopsis of the History of the Jews of Curaçao. Curazao: Imprenta de la Librería, 1897.
Emmanuel, Isaac S. and Suzanne A. History of the Jews of the Netherlands Antilles. 2 vols. Cincinnati: American Jewish Archives, 1970.
Rupert, Linda M. "Contraband Trade and the Shaping of Colonial Societies in Curaçao and Tierra Firme." Itinerario 30 (2006): 35–54.

External links 

Curaçao. The World Factbook. Central Intelligence Agency.
Government of Curaçao 
Government of Curaçao  
Curaçao Tourism Board
Curaçao Official Instagram Account
Directory and information guide for Curaçao
First Millennium Development Goals and Report. Curaçao and Sint Maarten. 2011

 
 

 
Caribbean countries of the Kingdom of the Netherlands
Islands of the Netherlands Antilles
Island countries
Dutch-speaking countries and territories
English-speaking countries and territories
1954 establishments in the Netherlands Antilles
States and territories established in 1954
States and territories established in 2010
2010s establishments in the Caribbean
2010 establishments in North America
2010 establishments in the Netherlands